Yuanyang County is a county under the administration of the prefecture-level city of Xinxiang, in the north of Henan province, China.

Administrative divisions
The county is divided into 3 towns and 14 townships.  The towns and townships in Yuanyang County are:
Towns
Chengguan
Yuanwu
Shizhai (

Townships

Climate

Notes

Further reading
 
 

County-level divisions of Henan
Xinxiang